Curvularia senegalensis is a fungal plant pathogen.

Cu. senegalensis is a pathogenic fungus. It is closely related to Cu. asianensis, Cu. geniculata, and Cu. soli. This group is distinguished by conidia which are mostly 4-distoseptate. Cu. senegalensis is distinguished from Cu. soli by shorter conidiophores (up to 150 μm) and wider conidia (1014 μm).

References

External links 
 Index Fungorum
 USDA ARS Fungal Database

Fungal plant pathogens and diseases
Pleosporaceae
Fungi described in 1914